The University of West Florida (West Florida or UWF) is a public university in Pensacola, Florida. The university's mascot is Argie the Argonaut and its logo is the chambered nautilus.

History

In 1962, the Florida Legislature authorized the State Board of Education to locate a state university in Escambia County. Harold Crosby was appointed the first president in July 1964. UWF became the sixth institution of the State University System of Florida, which today consists of twelve public universities.

Ground was broken on April 16, 1965, and in the same year the chambered nautilus was adopted as the official UWF emblem. UWF was originally an upper-level institution, enrolling juniors, seniors and graduate students. The first students began classes in the fall of 1967, and in June 1968, 58 students received degrees in the first commencement ceremony. In 1969, the Southern Association of Colleges and Schools accredited the university undergraduate programs, and the first master's degree programs were established.

In July 1979, the university organized into a more traditional structure by establishing three colleges: Arts and Sciences, Business, and Education. In 1999, the colleges reorganized into the College of Arts and Sciences, the College of Business and the College of Professional Studies. In Aug. 2012, the former three-college structure transitioned into four academic colleges: College of Arts, Social Sciences and Humanities; College of Education and Professional Studies; College of Science, Engineering and Health; and the College of Business. The most recent reorganization took place in 2015, splitting the former College of Science, Engineering and Health in two.

Today, the university has five colleges: College of Arts, Social Sciences and Humanities; College of Business; College of Education and Professional Studies; Hal Marcus College of Science and Engineering; and Usha Kundu, MD College of Health.

Chambered Nautilus
Harold Crosby, the university's first president, selected the chambered nautilus to represent UWF because he was inspired by the poem "The Chambered Nautilus" by Oliver Wendell Holmes; it is "a symbol of growth, change and accomplishment."

Administration, academics and organization
The University of West Florida is a public institution, receiving most of its funding through state funds and tuition. A 13-member Board of Trustees governs the university. The board is composed of six members appointed by the Governor of Florida, five appointed by the Board of Governors, the Faculty Senate president and the president of the Student Government Association.

The undergraduate and graduate programs are divided into five Colleges: College of Arts, Social Sciences and Humanities; College of Business; College of Education and Professional Studies; Hal Marcus College of Science and Engineering; and Usha Kundu, MD College of Health.

The University of West Florida is composed of four divisions which manage the operations of the institution as well as its direct support organizations: Academic Affairs; Academic Engagement and Student Affairs; Finance and Administration; and University Advancement.

Campuses

Pensacola campus 
The main campus of 1,600 acres (6.5 km2) of rolling hills and natural woodland along the Escambia River is ten miles (16 km) north of downtown Pensacola, in the Ferry Pass area. Its facilities have been designed to complement the natural forest and waterways. UWF's John C. Pace Library is the largest library in the Northwest Florida area. In addition to the main library on the main campus north of Pensacola, Florida, there is a branch library in Fort Walton Beach, Florida. It has 628,000 printed volumes, 1 million microfilms and microfiches, 3,000 serial subscriptions and nearly 2,000 online journal subscriptions. UWF has a second location, UWF on the Emerald Coast, in Fort Walton Beach, Florida.

Historic Pensacola Village

In 2001, the university acquired West Florida Historic Preservation, Inc, the previously state-controlled group that manages the Historic Pensacola Village. The university has created several classes taught by and/or in conjunction with the staff at Historic Pensacola.

UWF Historic Trust

The UWF Historic Trust collects, preserves and interprets the history of northwest Florida.

Arcadia Mill Complex

The Arcadia Mill complex is on the National Register of Historic Places. It was the first industrial complex powered by water in Florida. It included shops, mills, a railroad drawn by mules and a 16-mile log flume. It operated from 1817 to 1855. It is curated by the University of West Florida.

Student life

Currently, UWF enrolls more than 12,500 students between undergraduate and graduate programs across its colleges. UWF has conferred more than 100,000 associate, bachelor's, master's, specialist and doctoral degrees.

UWF hosts many opportunities for involvement through student clubs and organizations. Registered student organizations, administered by Student Involvement, include academic clubs, Greek organizations, professional and honor societies, religious organizations and special interest groups. Additionally, UWF owns property on Pensacola Beach, frequently used by students for research and recreation. UWF also offers numerous on-campus mountain bike trails to students free of charge, in addition to a wide variety of recreational activities.

Housing
UWF offers traditional residence halls, small community residence halls and university-owned apartment complexes. The university also offers living learning communities, which provide signature programming and academic support to residents.

Greek life

The following Greek letter organizations are recognized at UWF:

North American Interfraternity Conference fraternities
Alpha Tau Omega (ΑΤΩ)
Kappa Alpha Order (ΚΑ)
Pi Kappa Alpha (ΠΚΑ)
Sigma Alpha Epsilon (ΣΑΕ)
Sigma Alpha Mu (ΣΑΜ)
National Panhellenic Conference sororities
Alpha Gamma Delta (ΑΓΔ)
Alpha Delta Pi (ΑΔΠ)
Alpha Chi Omega (ΑΧΩ)
Kappa Delta (ΚΔ)
National Pan-Hellenic Council fraternities and sororities
Alpha Phi Alpha (ΑΦΑ)
Alpha Kappa Alpha (ΑΚΑ)
Phi Beta Sigma (ΦΒΣ)
Sigma Gamma Rho (ΣΓΡ)
Zeta Phi Beta (ΖΦΒ)
Multicultural organizations
Delta Phi Lambda (ΔΦΛ)
Kappa Delta Chi (ΚΔΧ)
Professional Fraternity Association fraternities
Delta Sigma Pi (ΔΣΠ)
National honor societies
Gamma Theta Upsilon (ΓΘΥ)
Psi Chi (ΨΧ)
Sigma Alpha Pi (ΣΑΠ)

Transportation
UWF offers a trolley service and public bicycles around campus known as "yellow bikes". There is parking for all visitors, students and employees. The Escambia County Area Transit bus system also offers students a discount rate.

Athletics

West Florida athletic teams are the Argonauts. The university is a member of the Division II level of the National Collegiate Athletic Association (NCAA), primarily competing in the Gulf South Conference (GSC) since the 1994–95 academic year. The Argonauts previously competed in the Southern States Conference of the National Association of Intercollegiate Athletics (NAIA) from 1974–75 to 1993–94, with a brief hiatus of dropping its athletics program from 1976–77 to 1979–80.

West Florida competes in 15 intercollegiate varsity sports: Men's sports include baseball, basketball, cross country, football, golf, soccer and tennis; while women's sports include basketball, cross country, golf, soccer, softball, swimming and diving, tennis and volleyball.

Accomplishments
UWF's athletic program has won ten national championships, with the most recent being football in the 2019 NCAA Division II Football Championship; as well as winning a women's tennis GSC championship for the 19th time, making that its 100th conference championship in school history.

Football
In 2015, the university welcomed its first football team on campus and held intra-team scrimmages throughout the fall. In 2016, UWF hosted its inaugural season, kicking off with a 45–0 win against Ave Maria University.

In 2017, the football program qualified for the NCAA Division II playoffs in just its second season. The team reached the championship game, losing to Texas A&M-Commerce, 37–27, in just the 26th game in school history.

In 2019, UWF's football program won the NCAA Division II national championship in its fourth season, winning against Minnesota State University, 48–40.

Notable people

Image gallery

See also 

John C. Pace Library

Notes

References

External links
 
 Official athletics website

 
1963 establishments in Florida
Buildings and structures in Pensacola, Florida
Educational institutions established in 1963
Education in Escambia County, Florida
Pensacola, Florida
Pensacola metropolitan area
University of West
Tourist attractions in Pensacola, Florida
Universities and colleges accredited by the Southern Association of Colleges and Schools